Milan Šašić (born 18 October 1958) is a Croatian football manager. Šašić has managed three clubs in the 2. Bundesliga for six seasons.

Coaching career
Šašić managed NK Karlovac from July 1988 to June 1991, DJK Gebhardshain-Steinebach from July 1994 to June 1995, VfL Hamm/Sieg from July 1995 to June 2001, TuS Koblenz from May 2002 to April 2007, 1. FC Kaiserslautern from February 2008 to May 2009, and MSV Duisburg from November 2009 to October 2011. Šašić has managed 1. FC Saarbrücken from September 2013 to February 2014.

Coaching record

Honours

Managerial
TuS Koblenz
Oberliga Südwest: 2003-04
Regionalliga Süd runners-up: 2005-06

 MSV Duisburg
DFB-Pokal runners-up: 2010–11

References

 

1958 births
Living people
Croatian football managers
NK Karlovac managers
1. FC Kaiserslautern managers
1. FC Saarbrücken managers
MSV Duisburg managers
Expatriate football managers in Germany
Croatian expatriate sportspeople in Germany
Croatian sports coaches
Sportspeople from Karlovac
2. Bundesliga managers
Croatian people of Serbian descent
3. Liga managers
TuS Koblenz managers